Naval Air Station Livermore was a United States Navy military facility located in Livermore, California.

History
This station was built in 1942 four miles east of Livermore to relieve overcrowding of the naval air facilities at Naval Air Station Oakland. The primary mission of the base was to train pilots. On 5 January 1951, the Bureau of Yards and Docks, U.S. Navy, formally transferred the former NAS Livermore in its entirety to the Atomic Energy Commission (AEC) for use by the University of California's Radiation Laboratory. Although the Public Buildings Service, General Services Administration, was informed that the facility was surplus, documentation supports the direct transfer of the former NAS Livermore from the U.S. Navy to the Atomic Energy Commission and redeveloped into the Lawrence Livermore National Laboratory.

On March 12, 1944, the Jack Benny Radio Program broadcast live at the base. Jack Benny, Don Wilson (announcer), Dennis Day, Mary Livingstone, Phil Harris, and Eddie "Rochester" Anderson were the cast.

Actor Robert Taylor (actor) (August 5, 1911 - June 8, 1969) served in the United States Naval Corp from 1943 to 1945. In January 1944, he started serving as a flight instructor at Livermore.

Outlying fields
NAS Livermore had the following outlying fields (OLFs) during the war (1943-1945):
Abel Field
Brown-Fabian Airport
Cope Field
Gelderman Airport
Heath Airport
Linderman Airport
Livermore Airport
May's School Field
Rita Butterworth Airport
Spring Valley Airport
Wagoner Airport

See also

California during World War II
American Theater (1939–1945)
United States home front during World War II

References

External links
Historic California Posts: Naval Air Station, Livermore

Livermore
Installations of the United States Navy in California
Livermore, California
Military facilities in the San Francisco Bay Area
Military installations closed in the 1950s

Closed installations of the United States Navy